Many products have been released by Australian recording artist Kylie Minogue over the years. These products have included books, DVDs, furniture, clothing (also used with videos and tours) and fragrances (for men and women).

Video albums

Concert tour

Music video compilations

Documentaries

Fragrances

In 2006, Minogue signed her first perfume endorsement deal with Coty, Inc. She launched her first fragrance Darling in November 2006. According to Thierry Wasser, she said she wanted to combine "strength and movement in order to reflect the intensity of my encounter with Kylie through this fragrance." With its design described as "glamorous, dynamic and heavy", it received generally favourable reviews from buyers. She launched the fragrance in Melbourne and Sydney and later released an EP titled Darling, a promotional release that came with the fragrance for free. In 2007, Sweet Darling and Sexy Darling, sub-labels of the original fragrance were released, though it wasn't as successful as its proceeded product.

In 2008, her fourth fragrance with Coty. Inc, Showtime was released. According to Minogue, she wanted a perfume that "could be a mirror of her personality" and described as her "second skin." The fragrance, however proved to be her least successful perfume. The following fragrance, Couture, was released. According to Minogue, the name "Couture" was inspired by fashion.

In 2009, Minogue begun work on her sixth fragrance. However, it was revealed in Kylie's description that the perfume will be for both genders. The fragrance; Inverse For Men, was released. It was Minogue's first men's fragrance, and currently her only. The packaging is described as "glossy" and "sparkly", and both packaging is the same for each gender, but the color being the only difference. Minogue's seventh fragrance, Pink Sparkle was released in 2010, two months before her eleventh studio album Aphrodite was released. According to Minogue, she wanted an "elegant, feel-good that takes you to a wonderful place of optimism and vitality." The bottle is designed as a champagne bottle, which the bottle top is designed as a corkscrew. She promoted the fragrance on The Paul O'Grady Show the same year. In 2011, her ninth fragrance Dazzling Darling was announced, responding back to the Darling range. Minogue stated that out of all her fragrance, she is comparing Dazzling Darling to herself, saying its "beautifully feminine and alluring" and that its "very soft and intimate."

In 2012, she released a fragrance called Music Box, which was a celebration fragrance for her K25 Anniversary, which is an anniversary of her music career spanning for twenty-five years. The perfume was described as a "refined and sophisticated" fragrance. Minogue was inspired by her fascination of music boxes when she was younger.

Music
Minogue has released live CDs for promotions of her tours. Her first live album Intimate and Live had moderate success, as she also played an extra bonus track called "Dancing Queen". The album was supported by her studio album Impossible Princess. In 2005, she released her UK/US live album Showgirl, for her tour Showgirl: Greatest Hits. It had limited success, as it only featured 7 tracks.
Minogue released her third live album, entitled Showgirl Homecoming Live. It had commercial success, charting in Australia and the UK. It was released worldwide in 2006. It became her most successful live album. She later released a live Album entitled Live in New York. It was released worldwide, but was fared well commercially in the United States especially.

Books

Kylie, an elaborate art book by Kylie Minogue was published in 2000 (1999 copyright by Darenote. Ltd.).  Featuring extensive contributions and collaboration by Kylie's creative director and close friend, Willy Baker, and contributions from fans, this has since become a highly sought after, rare collector's item.

Her next book, La La La, released to capitalise on Kylie's successful 2001/2002 era. It had moderate commercial success, and had sold a moderate number of books. A paperback edition was later released with additional photographs.

Minogue signed a deal with Puffin to release a children's book in 2006.
Later that year, Minogue released The Showgirl Princess. It was commercially successful, and was reported to sell a huge volume of books. The book promotes positive attitudes to children who look up to Minogue as an idol.

In 2008, while she was on tour with her worldwide commercially successful tour KylieX2008, for her multi-platinum album X, Minogue commissioned a limited print of 1000 books individually signed by her and her creative director, William Baker. K. The book featured new never before seen pictures and was available to order by attendees of the KylieX2008/9 world tour. A paperback edition was later issued.

In 2010, Minogue launched a website where users could buy personalised Kylie Minogue greetings card, in conjunction with PrintFair.

In 2012, Minogue released Kylie / Fashion.

Furniture
In 2008, Kylie launched Kylie at Home to much tabloid fanfare. The range is available online and also in prominent high street retailers such as House of Fraser, Debenhams and British Home Stores. In October 2010 a new Kylie at Home collection was released, which featured new additions such as scented candles. A new bedding range was released in September 2011 under the Kylie at Home range. The range currently includes products such as curtains, bedding, pillows, towels, candles and lamp shades.
It was all released by an endorsement deal with AshleyWildeGroup.

Fashion designing
Minogue has released her own collection of clothing on her website. It includes T-shirts, pants, gloves and scarves. On her site, it also includes Showgirl outfits, especially from her previous tours, including Showgirl: The Greatest Hits Tour and Showgirl: The Homecoming Tour.

In 2003 Minogue released her phenomenally successful LoveKylie lingerie range, and she became the face of Agent Provocateur.

In 2007 Minogue was approached by H&M to design and promote a beach ware line. Demand outstripped supply and the collection sold out within weeks, becoming H&M's highest selling celebrity range ever.

Television and film releases
Minogue has made several television and film appearances, including an Ant and Dec special, Kath & Kim, Doctor Who as Astrid Peth and The Vicar of Dibley. She also had a minor role as the Green Fairy in the film Moulin Rouge!, singing to the main actors, including Ewan McGregor.

In 2007, Minogue released her documentary Film White Diamond. It featured her and her family and friends and an insight into her life and lifestyle. It had negative reviews and a lukewarm commercial response in Australia, New Zealand and the UK.

In 2008, she released a one-off program called The Kylie Show. It features Dannii Minogue and Simon Cowell as guest stars, also her former Neighbours co-star and "Especially for You" feature singer Jason Donavon. It wasn't available on DVD.

Video game appearances
In addition to appearing in the video game adaptions of Street Fighter in 1995, Minogue's songs have also appeared on several Singstar "Can't Get You Out of My Head" from Ubisoft Video Game called Just Dance since the initial game's release in 2004. In 2012, Kylie saw the release of her own video game, entitled Kylie Sing and Dance, which was released exclusively to the Nintendo Wii.

Kylie Minogue Wines 
Kylie launched her range of wines in the US in 2022, including rosé prosecco, after selling 5 Million bottles in 2 years in the UK.

See also

 Kylie Minogue albums discography
 Kylie Minogue singles discography
 List of songs recorded by Kylie Minogue
 Kylie Minogue filmography
 Kylie Minogue videography
 List of Kylie Minogue concert tours
 List of awards and nominations received by Kylie Minogue

References

External links
 

products